Lin Yen-jui (born 22 September 1986) is a Taiwanese badminton player. In 2013, he competed at the Kazan Summer Universiade and won bronze in the mixed team event.

Achievements

BWF International Challenge/Series
Men's doubles

 BWF International Challenge tournament
 BWF International Series tournament

References

External links
 

Taiwanese male badminton players
Living people
1986 births
Universiade medalists in badminton
Universiade bronze medalists for Chinese Taipei
Medalists at the 2013 Summer Universiade